Selski, Selsky or Selški means rural in several Slavic languages and may refer to 
Spoken Macedonian language
Selski Vrh, a settlement in Slovenia
Rovte v Selški Dolini, a settlement in Slovenia
Steve Selsky (born 1989), American baseball outfielder